SP-15  is a state highway in the state of São Paulo in Brazil. Part of it consists of the Marginal Tietê and the other part is the Marginal Pinheiros.

References

Highways in São Paulo (state)